Vera Margrethe Gebuhr (15 May 1916 – 22 December 2014) was a Danish film, television and stage actress. Gebuhr was most noted for her portrayal of the snobbish neurotic head saleswoman Miss Jørgensen in the popular television series Matador. She trained at the Royal Danish Theatre school from 1937 to 1939 and debuted at the Folketeatret, working there until 1964. She played her first lead film role as the scheming maid in the 1943 melodrama Møllen.  Gebuhr appeared in 65 films between 1937 and 2005, as well as made numerous appearances on Danish television series.

Gebuhr married twice: to journalist Pallet Fønss and civil engineer Thomas Purl. In 1999, she received the Preben Neergaard honorary award. She died in her home at the age of 98 on 22 December 2014.

Filmography

 Flådens blå matroser – 1937
 Tag det som en mand – 1941
 Frøken Vildkat – 1942
 Som du vil ha' mig – 1943
 Møllen – 1943
 Lev livet let – 1944
 Elly Petersen – 1944
 Besættelse – 1944
 Hans store aften – 1946
 Diskret ophold – 1946
 Ta', hvad du vil ha' – 1947
 For frihed og ret – 1947
 Kampen mod uretten – 1949
 Min kone er uskyldig – 1950
 Lynfotografen – 1950
 Familien Schmidt – 1951
 We Who Go the Kitchen Route (1953)
 The Crime of Tove Andersen (1953)
 Blændværk – 1955
 Kispus – 1956
 Skovridergården – 1957
 Ingen tid til kærtegn – 1957
 Krudt og klunker – 1958
 Ballade på Bullerborg – 1959
 Oskar – 1962
 Duellen – 1962
 Et døgn uden løgn – 1963
 Premiere i helvede – 1964
 Gertrud – 1964
 Nøglen til Paradis – 1970
 Far til fire i højt humør – 1971
 Tjærehandleren – 1971
 Den forsvundne fuldmægtig – 1971
 Farlige kys – 1972
 Mig og Mafiaen – 1973
 Mafiaen, det er osse mig – 1974
 Pas på ryggen, professor – 1977
 Olsen-banden overgiver sig aldrig – 1979
 Pengene eller livet – 1982
 Kurt og Valde – 1983
 Min farmors hus – 1984
 Sidste akt – 1987
 Elvis Hansen – en samfundshjælper – 1988
 Europa – 1991
 Sort høst – 1993]
 Davids bog – 1996
 Riget II – 1997
 Let's Get Lost – 1997
 Se dagens lys – 2003
 Afgrunden'' – 2004

References

External links 
 
 
 
 Interview with Vera Gebuhr (Danish) Published November 2008

1916 births
2014 deaths
Danish film actresses
Danish stage actresses
Danish television actresses